Chalcides mionecton, the mionecton skink or Morocco cylindrical skink, is a species of skink in the family Scincidae. It is found only in Morocco.

There are two subspecies:
Genetic data suggest that these should be considered separate species, but they are not separable using external morphological characteristics.

Its natural habitats are sandy shores, arable land, pastureland, and rural gardens. It is threatened by habitat loss.

References

Chalcides
Skinks of Africa
Reptiles of North Africa
Endemic fauna of Morocco
Reptiles described in 1874
Taxa named by Oskar Boettger
Taxonomy articles created by Polbot